Car hawking, or drive-by falconry is a modern falconry technique which relies upon the use of a motor car or other motor vehicle as a base from which to hunt wild quarry species with a trained raptor.

Typically, the falconer will drive around in a car, slowly, seeking suitable small game in the immediate vicinity of the road. Once an appropriate target has been selected, the raptor is then slipped from the window of the moving vehicle as it passes by in order that it might engage with its prey.

Car hawking provides an advantage over more traditional methods of falconry in that the hawk is already moving at a considerable speed, with added momentum upon exiting the vehicle and as the car acts as cover, it has an enormous element of surprise over the quarry, giving it little or no time to react and potentially escape. Numerous videos exist on the internet of people successfully utilizing this method, flying Harris hawks, goshawks and other small raptors such as American Kestrels against feral pigeons and corvids in both urban and rural areas.

Legality of this practice varies by location and protected status of the quarry and some falconers consider car hawking to be extremely unsporting.

References

External links

Falconry